Detective Phil Fish is a fictional NYPD detective in the TV series Barney Miller and later in the spin off series Fish. He was played by Abe Vigoda.

Fish was an odd character for a television detective: aged, grumpy, and suffering from a variety of maladies for which he constantly needs medication. The most recurring malady was inflamed hemorrhoids, for which he could bring a donut cushion to his desk chair. The detectives' bathroom was as important to him as his desk.

Fish's wife was Bernice, played by Florence Stanley, who made occasional visits to the squad room and whose name the aging Fish once forgot during breakfast.

He retires at the age of 63 and 38 years of service from the 12th precinct, the character of Fish became the center of his own series, Fish, in which he and his wife served as foster parents for a number of troubled children, referred to euphemistically as PINS, or "persons in need of supervision".

His successor at the precinct was Det. Arthur P. Dietrich. Fish visited the 12th precinct once after his retirement from the force and played a role at the end of the series Fish (in the episode "Lady and the Bomb"), but it proved to be a bit of a letdown for him.

References

Fictional New York City Police Department detectives
Barney Miller characters
Television characters introduced in 1974